John U. Bacon is an American journalist and author of books on sports and business as well as a sports commentator on TV and radio.

Background
After graduating from Huron High School, Bacon earned a bachelor's degree in History and a master's degree in Education from the University of Michigan.  His first journalism job was as a lifestyle reporter for The Ann Arbor News in Ann Arbor, Michigan. In 1995, Bacon became a sports feature writer for The Detroit News. During this period, he wrote articles on baseball player Jackie Robinson, the sport of bullfighting, and high school basketball at a Potawatomi Native American reservation in Michigan.

In 1998, Bacon traveled to Nagano, Japan to cover the 1998 Winter Olympics for The Detroit News. After the Olympics, Bacon left The Detroit News to become a freelance writer. He has written articles for The New York Times, Time, and ESPN The Magazine.

In 2000, Bacon started his radio career with a sports show on WAAM in Ann Arbor. In 2002, he started a radio show, Off the Field, on WTKA in Ann Arbor. In 2007, Bacon began providing weekly sports commentary on Michigan public television stations.

In 2005, Bacon was awarded a Knight-Wallace Fellowship for journalism from the University of Michigan.

Books
Bacon is the author of several books on sports and business, including:

 America's corner store : Walgreens' prescription for success''   Wiley, 2004. Hoboken, N.J.  
 Fourth and Long: the fight for the soul of college football. Simon & Schuster, 2013 which explores college football, and the Big Ten, particularly the Ohio State University, University of Michigan, Michigan State University, University of Notre Dame and Pennsylvania State University football programs. Penn State's Bill O'Brien, Michael Mauti and Michael Zordich are some of the heroes of the story
 The Spark, about Cirque du Soleil
 Bo's Lasting Lessons, with former Michigan football coach Bo Schembechler The book includes chapters on Woody Hayes, Dave Brandon, Jim Hackett and Brad Bates. 
 Three and Out: Rich Rodriguez and the Michigan Wolverines in the Crucible of College Football. Some of the players Bacon followed include Brandon Graham, Denard Robinson and Michael Martin, and strength coach Mike Barwis.  
 Endzone: The Rise, Fall, and Return of Michigan Football. Covers Dave Brandon's tenure as athletic director and Jim Harbaugh's arrival.
 Playing Hurt: My Journey from Despair to Hope. Written as a memoir with John Saunders and published after Saunders' death.
 The Best of Bacon: Select Cuts.  University of Michigan Press, 2018.
 Let Them Lead: Unexpected Lessons in Leadership from America's Worst High School Hockey Team.  Houghton Mifflin Harcourt. 

Three and Out,  Fourth and Long    and  Endzone  have been New York Times bestsellers.

Media appearances
Bacon provides weekly sports commentary on behalf of the University of Michigan's athletic program for Michigan Radio and appears often on NPR, ESPN and the Big Ten Network, among other networks. In 2015, his radio essay won first prize in the Public Radio News Directors Incorporated (PRNDI) awards. Bacon has been a guest on NPR's quiz shows Wait Wait...Don't Tell Me!  and Ask Me Another.

Bacon gives speeches for corporations and other organizations, including three TEDx talks, another to receive the Golden Apple Award, and the Knight-Wallace Fellows Program's Hovey Lecture.

Academia
Bacon teaches at the Medill School of Journalism at Northwestern University and at the University of Michigan. In 2009, Michigan students awarded him the Golden Apple Award for excellence in teaching. In 2019, Bacon taught a class on Teaching and Coaching at the University of Michigan School of Education.

Bacon coached the hockey team of his alma mater, Huron High School, from 2000 to 2004. He led the team from its worst to its best record in school history in three years. In 2007, Bacon was inducted into the River Rat Hall of Fame.

In 2019, Bacon appointed by Gov. Rick Snyder to the Michigan Technological University Board of Trustees

Personal life
Bacon is married to the former Christie Breitner, and they have one son.

References

External links
 

Year of birth missing (living people)
American sportswriters
American sports announcers
University of Michigan College of Literature, Science, and the Arts alumni
Living people
University of Michigan fellows
University of Michigan School of Education alumni